Balama is a town in Balama District of Cabo Delgado Province in northern Mozambique. It is the seat of the district.

References

External links
Satellite map at Maplandia.com

Populated places in Cabo Delgado Province